Nancy Drew... Trouble Shooter is a 1939 American comedy film directed by William Clemens and written by Kenneth Gamet. The film stars Bonita Granville, Frankie Thomas, John Litel, Aldrich Bowker, Charlotte Wynters and Edgar Edwards. The film was released by Warner Bros. on June 17, 1939.

Plot

Cast 
 Bonita Granville as Nancy Drew
 Frankie Thomas as Ted Nickerson
 John Litel as Carson Drew
 Aldrich Bowker as Matt Brandon
 Charlotte Wynters as Edna Gregory
 Edgar Edwards as 'Chuck' Marley
 Renie Riano as Effie Schneider
 Roger Imhof as Sheriff Barney Riggs
 Erville Alderson as Clint Griffith
 Willie Best as Apollo Johnson
 John Harron as Greenhouse Clerk
 Cliff Saum as First Deputy Sheriff
 Tom Wilson as Milt
 Glen Cavender as First Townsman (uncredited) 
 Creighton Hale as Man in Sheriff's Office (uncredited) 
 Leo White as Man in Sheriff's Office (uncredited)

References

External links 
 
 
 
 

1939 films
Warner Bros. films
American comedy films
1939 comedy films
Films directed by William Clemens
Films scored by Heinz Roemheld
American black-and-white films
Films based on Nancy Drew
1930s English-language films
1930s American films